Johnson County is a county in the U.S. state of Kansas, on the border with Missouri. As of the 2020 census, the population was 609,863, making it the most populous county in Kansas. Its county seat is Olathe. Largely suburban, the county contains a number of suburbs of Kansas City, Missouri, including Overland Park, a principal city of and second most populous city in the Kansas City Metropolitan Area.

History
This was part of the large territory of the Osage people, who occupied lands up to present-day Saint Louis, Missouri. After the Indian Removal, the United States government reserved much of this area as Indian territory for a reservation for the Shawnee people, who were relocated from east of the Mississippi River in the upper Midwest.

The Santa Fe Trail and Oregon–California Trail, which pass through nearby Independence, Missouri, also passed through the county. Johnson County was established in 1855 as one of the first counties in the newly organized Kansas Territory; it was named for American missionary Thomas Johnson. The renowned gunfighter Wild Bill Hickok settled for a time in the county, becoming constable of Monticello Township in 1858.

Johnson County was the site of many battles between abolitionists and pro-slavery advocates during the period of Bleeding Kansas, prior to the residents voting on whether slavery would be allowed in the territory. In 1862 during the American Civil War, Confederate guerrillas from nearby Missouri, led by William Quantrill, raided the Johnson County communities of Olathe and Spring Hill. They killed half a dozen men and destroyed numerous homes and businesses.

The county was largely rural until the early 20th century, when housing subdivisions were developed in the northeastern portion of the county adjacent to Kansas City, Missouri. Developer J. C. Nichols spurred the boom in 1914 when he built the Mission Hills Country Club to lure upscale residents who previously had been reluctant to move from Missouri to Kansas. Suburban development continued at a steady pace until the close of World War II.

Following the war, the pace of development exploded, triggered by the return of veterans in need of housing, construction of highways that facilitated commuting from suburbs, and the pent-up demand for new housing. The US Supreme Court ruling in Brown v. Board of Education (1954) ruled that segregation of public schools was unconstitutional. Integration of public schools in Kansas City, Missouri, resulted in many white families leaving the inner city, resulting in increased migration to the county for new housing and what were considered higher quality public schools, generally an indicator of higher economic status. From the mid-1980s the pace of growth increased significantly, with the county adding 100,000 residents each decade between the 1990 census and 2010 census.

The 1952 Johnson County Courthouse was closed in 2020, then demolished in 2021.  It was replaced by a seven-story courthouse in 2021 after over two years of construction. This new courthouse is the county's fourth building.

Geography

Topography
The natural topography of the county consists of gently rolling terrain. The Kansas River forms a portion of the northwest boundary of the county.  The elevation generally increases from north to south as the distance from the Kansas and Missouri rivers increases.

Watersheds and streams
The county is drained by the watersheds of the Kansas, Blue, and Marais des Cygnes, all of which are part of the Missouri River watershed. Located in northeastern Kansas, the county receives plentiful rainfall.  The county contains numerous small streams, including Kill Creek, Mill Creek, Turkey Creek, Indian Creek, Brush Creek, Tomahawk Creek, the Blue River, Bull Creek and Little Bull Creek.

Kill Creek begins in the southwest portion of the county and flows northward into the Kansas River at De Soto.  Mill Creek begins in the central portion of the county in Olathe, flowing northward it empties into the Kansas River at Shawnee.  Turkey Creek and Brush Creek each begin in northeast Johnson County.  Turkey Creek flows northeastward into Wyandotte County and joins the Kansas River just before its confluence with the Missouri River at Kaw Point.  Brush Creek flows east-northeastward through Prairie Village and Mission Hills, entering Kansas City, Missouri, within the median of Ward Parkway and passing the Country Club Plaza before emptying into the Blue River east of the Country Club Plaza and north of Swope Park. Indian Creek begins in the southern portion of Olathe and Tomahawk Creek begins in south Overland Park.  Each flows northeastward meeting in Leawood, where the stream retains the name of Indian Creek, just before crossing the state line and entering the Blue River in Kansas City, Missouri. The Blue River begins in rural southern Johnson County and flows north-northeastward through the southeastern portion of the county and crossing the state line just east of the intersection of 151st Street and Kenneth Road in southern Overland Park.  The Blue River flows through southern and eastern Kansas City before joining the Missouri River. Bull Creek and Little Bull Creek begin in rural southwestern Johnson County and flow southward where they enter Hillsdale Lake before continuing into Miami County, eventually joining the Marais des Cygnes at Paola.

Flora and fauna
The county consists primarily of prairie grassland with corridors of forested areas along streams and rivers.

Adjacent counties
 Wyandotte County (north)
 Jackson County, Missouri (east)
 Cass County, Missouri (southeast)
 Miami County (south)
 Franklin County (southwest)
 Douglas County (west)
 Leavenworth County (northwest)

Demographics

Johnson County (county code JO) is included in the Kansas City metropolitan area. The county has the highest median household income at $81,121 in 2017 and the highest per-capita income in Kansas, with the 19th highest median household income in 2000 and the 46th highest per-capita income in 2005. In 2010, Money magazine, in its list of the '100 Best Cities in the United States' in which to live, ranked Overland Park 7th (ranked 6th in 2006 and 9th in 2008) and Shawnee 17th (ranked 39th in 2008).  In 2008 the same magazine also ranked Olathe 11th.

2010
As of the 2010 census, there were 544,179 people, 210,278 households, and 143,509 families residing in the county. The racial makeup of the county was 86.0% White, 4.2% Asian, 4.3% Black or African American, 0.4% Native American, 0.01% Pacific Islander, 1.55% from other races, and 2.5% from two or more races. Hispanic or Latino of any race were 7.2% of the population. 30.6% identified as of German, 16.8% Irish, 13.6% English and 5.7% American ancestry.

There were 210,278 households, out of which 34.6% had children under the age of 18 living with them, 56.1% were married couples living together, 8.4% had a female householder with no husband present, and 31.8% were non-families. 25.9% of all households were made up of individuals, and 7.8% had someone living alone who was 65 years of age or older. The average household size was 2.51 and the average family size was 3.05.

In the county, the population was spread out, with 26.3% under the age of 18, 7.60% from 18 to 24, 32.80% from 25 to 44, 22.50% from 45 to 64, and 10.9% who were 65 years of age or older. The median age was 36.4 years. 48.8% of the population were males and 51.2% of the population were females.

The median income for a household in the county was $73,733, and the median income for a family was $90,380. Males had a median income of $61,346 versus $43,785 for females. The per capita income for the county was $37,882. About 3.6% of families and 5.5% of the population were below the poverty line, including 7.1% of those under age 18 and 4.9% of those age 65 or over.

2000
As of the census2 of 2000, there were 451,086 people, 174,570 households, and 121,675 families residing in the county.  The population density was 365/km2 (946/mi2).  There were 181,612 housing units at an average density of 147/km2 (381/mi2).  The racial makeup of the county was 91.11% White, 2.61% Black or African American, 0.33% Native American, 2.83% Asian, 0.03% Pacific Islander, 1.55% from other races, and 1.54% from two or more races.  3.98% of the population were Hispanic or Latino of any race.

There were 174,570 households, out of which 36.00% had children under the age of 18 living with them, 59.20% were married couples living together, 7.80% had a female householder with no husband present, and 30.30% were non-families. 24.50% of all households were made up of individuals, and 6.70% had someone living alone who was 65 years of age or older.  The average household size was 2.56 and the average family size was 3.09.

In the county the population was spread out, with 27.10% under the age of 18, 7.60% from 18 to 24, 32.80% from 25 to 44, 22.50% from 45 to 64, and 10.00% who were 65 years of age or older.  The median age was 35 years.  For every 100 females there were 95.50 males.  For every 100 females age 18 and over, there were 92.00 males.

The median income for a household in the county was $61,455, and the median income for a family was $72,987. Males had a median income of $49,790 versus $32,145 for females. The per capita income for the county was $30,919.  3.40% of the population and 2.10% of families were below the poverty line.  Out of the total population, 3.30% of those under the age of 18 and 3.60% of those 65 and older were living below the poverty line.

Government

Laws
Johnson County was a prohibition, or "dry", county until the Kansas Constitution was amended in 1986 and voters approved the sale of alcoholic liquor by the individual drink, with a 30% food sales requirement.

The county voted "No" on the 2022 Kansas Value Them Both Amendment, an anti-abortion ballot measure, by 68% to 32%, outpacing its support of Joe Biden during the 2020 presidential election.

Federal representation

Johnson County is entirely located within Kansas's 3rd congressional district, which has been represented by Democrat Sharice Davids since 2019. The two U.S. Senators from Kansas are Republicans Roger Marshall and Jerry Moran.

Johnson County has traditionally been considered a Republican stronghold. From 1920 through 2016, it voted for the GOP in every presidential election. This included the 1964 election, in which Barry Goldwater carried the county by nine points even as he lost Kansas statewide; the last time the Republicans have failed to carry the state. Earlier, it was one of the few counties where Franklin Roosevelt was shut out in all four of his campaigns, though FDR only lost the county by two votes in his 42-state landslide of 1932. 

However, in 2016, Johnson County voted for Republican presidential nominee Donald Trump by less than a three point margin, as the GOP's shift towards right-wing populism was considered a poor fit for the county's many moderate voters. In 2020, former Vice President Joe Biden became the first Democrat to win Johnson County since Woodrow Wilson 104 years earlier, winning the county by an 8% margin. Biden's share of the vote was also the most ever won by a Democrat in Johnson County.

State representation
Johnson County is home to 25 Kansas state representatives and 9 Kansas state senators. 13 out of 25 of Johnson County's representatives are Republicans, as are 6 of the county's 9 senators. Numerous Republicans from the area identify as moderates, compared to some of the more ideological hard-liners from other parts of the state. Differences between moderates and the more hard-line members can most commonly be seen on social issues, the most infamous being the numerous debates about the state's school finance formula in 2004 and 2014–2018.

County government and unincorporated areas
The county government is administered by an elected, seven-member Board of County Commissioners, with six elected from single-member districts and one at-large. Ed Eilert, former mayor of Overland Park, serves as the current County Chairman.  Penny Postoak Ferguson has served as the county manager since 2018. Previously Hannes Zaccharias served this position from 2009 - 2018.  Governance of the county is divided into six districts.  The county government has full jurisdiction of the unincorporated areas of the county and limited jurisdiction of those areas of the county within incorporated places.  For instance, decisions regarding the regulation of land use, development and zoning in unincorporated areas of the county are the responsibility of the county government, whereas such decisions for areas within incorporated places are the jurisdiction of the incorporated city of which the property is a part.

Sales taxes
The current sales tax rate in Johnson County is 7.975%, higher than the 6.5% rate in Wyandotte (where Kansas City, Kansas is located). The sales tax rates of each of the surrounding counties are nearly the same as the rate in Johnson County. Individual cities have additional sales taxes.

Property taxes
Property taxes are a conglomeration of state, county, city, and school district taxes. Property tax rates are generally lower in Johnson County because property values in the county are higher than in other counties throughout Kansas.

Note: Some cities have multiple tax rates because they are divided among multiple school districts. The above rates are what exist for the majority of residents in the city.

Law enforcement

The Johnson County Sheriff's Office runs the jails at Olathe and New Century, and patrols the unincorporated parts of Johnson County as well as the cities of Edgerton and DeSoto.

In 2019, the county announced that it is creating a new task force with shared jurisdiction between neighboring Miami and Franklin counties to combat crime.

Education

According to the 2010 Census Bureau, the education attainment of the population 25 years and over: 95.6% high school graduate or higher, 51.1% bachelor's degree or higher, and 17.9% graduate or professional degree.

The Johnson County Library has 13 branches.

Unified school districts
 Blue Valley USD 229
 Spring Hill USD 230
 Gardner-Edgerton USD 231
 De Soto USD 232
 Olathe USD 233
 Shawnee Mission USD 512

Colleges and universities
 Johnson County Community College 
 University of Kansas Edwards Campus
 Kansas State University, Olathe Campus
 Kansas Christian College (Overland Park) 
 MidAmerica Nazarene University
 Baker University, Overland Park Campus
 Ottawa University, Overland Park Campus
 Park University, Lenexa Campus

Transportation
Johnson County has a grid network through most of the county, with a road every mile. The grid has facilitated rapid growth and easy access. Interstate 435 runs through much of the county, and serves as a developmental "border" in the northbound–southbound portion. The westbound–eastbound part of I-435 divides the county into a northern and southern section. The northern section is older, while the southern portion is the fastest-growing area in Johnson County, containing a massive volume of new homes.

The Johnson County numbered street grid generally begins at 47th Street, the Wyandotte County line (the lowest numbered street is 40th Street in Bonner Springs), and is a continuation of the adjacent Kansas City, Missouri, street grid. The grid continues to 215th Street, and into Miami County (with somewhat different named roads) to 407th Street at the Miami-Linn county line, with most suburban development ending around 167th Street. Named streets in the grid run from State Line Road (1900 West) to County Line Road (40699 West) at the Douglas County line. A portion of the grid extends north from Westwood into the Rosedale area in Kansas City, Kansas.

Another principal highway running through the area is Interstate 35, which runs diagonally through the county, entering it near Downtown Kansas City, and continuing through Olathe and Gardner. Outside the county, it eventually leads to Duluth, Minnesota in the north and the US–Mexico border in the south. U.S. 69 also serves Johnson County, entering from Wyandotte County at the south end of Interstate 635. Much of U.S. 69 within the county is freeway; this freeway eventually heads south and connects to Fort Scott and the rest of southeast Kansas.

Major highways
 Southwest corner with Franklin County northeast through Edgerton, Gardner, Olathe, Lenexa, Overland Park, and Merriam to the northeast corner with downtown Kansas City
 Northern border with Wyandotte County south through Shawnee and Lenexa to K-10 then east through Overland Park and Leawood to the Missouri border
  Starts in Johnson County at I-35 and enters Wyandotte County/Kansas City, KS less than 1000 feet later.
 Southwest corner with Franklin County northeast through Edgerton, Gardner, Olathe, Lenexa, Overland Park, and Merriam to the northeast corner with downtown Kansas City
 Southwest border with Douglas County east through Edgerton and Gardner to I-35
 Southeast border with Miami County north through Stilwell and Overland Park past I-435 to I-35
  Southern border with Miami County. Joins with I-35 in Olathe.
 Southern border with Miami County north through Spring Hill, Olathe, Lenexa, and Shawnee to Wyandotte County
 Western border with Douglas County east through De Soto, Lenexa, and Olathe to I-435

Airports
Johnson County is home to three general aviation airports:
 Johnson County Executive Airport
 New Century AirCenter
 Hillside Airport

The closest airport with airline service is Kansas City International Airport in Platte County, Missouri

Public transit
Johnson County Transit is the public transit operator.

Communities

Cities

 Bonner Springs (partly in Wyandotte County and Leavenworth County)
 De Soto (partly in Leavenworth County)
 Edgerton
 Fairway*
 Gardner
 Lenexa*
 Leawood*
 Lake Quivira* (partly in Wyandotte County)
 Merriam*
 Mission*
 Mission Hills*
 Mission Woods*
 Overland Park*
 Olathe (county Seat) 
 Prairie Village*
 Roeland Park*
 Shawnee*
 Spring Hill (partly in Miami County)
 Westwood*
 Westwood Hills*

*Cities included in Shawnee Mission, a postal designation encompassing cities or regions thereof in northeastern Johnson County, headquarter post office located in Mission.

Unincorporated communities
 Bonita
 Clare
 Clearview City
 Ocheltree
 Stanley
 Stilwell
 Wilder

Townships
Johnson County was originally divided into nine townships, two of which have since been eliminated by the annexation of all their territory into independent municipalities. All of the cities are considered governmentally independent and are excluded from the census figures for the townships. In the following table, the population center is the largest city (or cities) included in that township's population total, if it is of a significant size.

In popular culture
 The ABC apocalyptic drama film The Day After was partially filmed in De Soto.
 Mission Hills is the setting for The ABC Family show Switched at Birth.
 Netflix original documentary Dirty Money, season 1 episode 2, entitled "Payday", features the infamous predatory loan practices of Scott Tucker, a resident of Leawood. The episode features numerous aerial views of the area.
 The indie film All Creatures Here Below is partially set in De Soto, and filmed in Kansas City.

See also

 National Register of Historic Places listings in Johnson County, Kansas

References

Further reading

 History of Johnson County, Kansas; Ed Blair; 469 pages; 1915.
 Standard Atlas of Johnson County, Kansas; Geo. A. Ogle & Co; 78 pages; 1922.
 Standard Atlas of Johnson County, Kansas; Geo. A. Ogle & Co; 51 pages; 1902.
 Atlas Map of Johnson County, Kansas; E.F. Heisler; 86 pages; 1874.

External links

County
 
 Johnson County - Directory of Public Officials
Historical
 Johnson County History
Maps
 Johnson County Maps: Current, Historic, KDOT
 Kansas Highway Maps: Current, Historic, KDOT
 Kansas Railroad Maps: Current, 1996, 1915, KDOT and Kansas Historical Society

 
Kansas counties
Kansas City metropolitan area
1855 establishments in Kansas Territory